Kempa is a surname. Notable bearers include:

 Beata Kempa (born 1966), Polish politician
 Bernhard Kempa (1920–2017), German handball player
 Diana Kempa (born 1992), Kazakhstani volleyball player

See also
 
 Kempa Airport
 Kempa, a Uhlsport brand